Phaea is a genus of longhorn beetles of the subfamily Lamiinae, containing the following species:

 Phaea acromela Pascoe, 1858
 Phaea andrewsi Chemsak, 1999
 Phaea astatheoides Pascoe, 1866
 Phaea beierli Chemsak, 1999
 Phaea biplagiata Chemsak, 1977
 Phaea brevicornis Chemsak, 1999
 Phaea bryani Chemsak, 1999
 Phaea canescens (LeConte, 1852)
 Phaea carnelia Chemsak & Linsley, 1988
 Phaea coccinea Bates, 1866
 Phaea copei Chemsak, 1999
 Phaea crocata Pascoe, 1866
 Phaea elegantula Melzer, 1933
 Phaea erinae Chemsak, 1999
 Phaea eyai Chemsak, 1999
 Phaea flavovittata Bates, 1881
 Phaea giesberti Chemsak, 1999
 Phaea haleyae Chemsak, 1999
 Phaea hatsueae Chemsak, 1999
 Phaea hoegei Bates, 1881
 Phaea hovorei Chemsak, 1999
 Phaea howdenorum Chemsak, 1999
 Phaea janzeni Chemsak, 1999
 Phaea johni Chemsak, 1999
 Phaea juanitae Chemsak & Linsley, 1988
 Phaea kaitlinae Chemsak, 1999
 Phaea kellyae Chemsak, 1999
 Phaea lateralis Bates, 1881
 Phaea laurieae Chemsak, 1999
 Phaea lawi Chemsak, 1999
 Phaea linsleyi Chemsak, 1999
 Phaea maccartyi Chemsak, 1999
 Phaea mankinsi Chemsak & Linsley, 1979
 Phaea mariae Chemsak, 1999
 Phaea marthae Chemsak, 1977
 Phaea maryannae Chemsak, 1977
 Phaea maxima Bates, 1881
 Phaea miniata Pascoe, 1858
 Phaea mirabilis Bates, 1874
 Phaea monostigma (Haldeman, 1847)
 Phaea nigripennis Bates, 1881
 Phaea nigromaculata Bates, 1881
 Phaea noguerai Chemsak, 1999
 Phaea phthisica Bates, 1881
 Phaea rosea Bates, 1885
 Phaea rubella Bates, 1881
 Phaea rufiventris Bates, 1872
 Phaea saperda Newman, 1840
 Phaea scuticollis Bates, 1872
 Phaea semirufa Bates, 1872
 Phaea sharonae Chemsak, 1999
 Phaea sherylae Chemsak, 1999
 Phaea signaticornis Melzer, 1932
 Phaea tenuata Bates, 1872
 Phaea tricolor Bates, 1881
 Phaea turnbowi Chemsak, 1999
 Phaea vitticollis Bates, 1872
 Phaea wappesi Chemsak, 1999

References

 
Cerambycidae genera